The Student Life (abbreviated TSL) is a student newspaper covering the Claremont Colleges (7Cs, or 5Cs when referring only to the undergraduate colleges), a consortium of liberal arts colleges in Claremont, California. It is published weekly each Friday during the academic year, typically spans roughly ten pages per issue, and is primarily funded by the student governments of the colleges.

The paper is the oldest college newspaper in Southern California, having been published since 1889.  It is also the largest and most widely distributed campus newspaper at the 5Cs, with a significant readership among students, staff, faculty, alumni, and members of the Claremont community. It maintains a staff of around 130 students, including writers, columnists, photographers, videographers, designers, copy specialists, business associates, and editors.

TSL operates out of Room 101 in Walker Hall on the northern portion of Pomona College's campus.

History

TSL was founded in November 1889 (two years after the founding of Pomona College) as a four-page monthly called the Pomona Student. Initially an informal bulletin for campus happenings, it adopted its current name and moved to weekly publication in 1893.

By 1926, it was publishing five issues a week; many were filled largely with advertisements. In 1939, this was reduced to two issues per week to save money, and in 1944, these issues became only two pages long to conserve paper during World War II. After the war, it gradually expanded, and in 1956, it returned to weekly publication.

In 1965, it merged with other Claremont Colleges newspapers to form the Claremont Collegian, which covered all 5Cs, but it was revived two years later as a Pomona-only publication (except for a two-page weekly insert focusing on newly established Pitzer College).

Like other publications, TSL developed an increasingly robust digital presence in the 2000s and 2010s.

TSL used to be closely linked with the Associated Students of Pomona College, but moved to become increasingly independent. In 2008, it began shifting its focus to cover the entire consortium, and its coverage and staff makeup today reflect all 5Cs.

Sections

TSL has four primary sections that appear in each issue: News, Life & Style, Sports, and Opinions.

The News section appears at the front of the paper, and covers a range of campus politics, issues, and current events, and often includes investigative pieces.  The content specifically focuses on the 5Cs and life on campus, and does not usually include coverage of national or international stories.

The Life & Style section includes feature stories on campus life, as well as a number of weekly or bi-weekly columns. TSL is well known for its sex column, which appears regularly and is credited to an anonymous author or pseudonym.

The Opinions section includes opinions pieces by columnists and guest columnists, as well as editorials. The content in this section reflects a broad range of the ideological views found at the 5Cs, which tend (with the exception of Claremont McKenna College) to lean strongly progressive compared to other college campuses.

The Sports section covers the Pomona-Pitzer Sagehens and Claremont-Mudd-Scripps Stags and Athenas, as well as national sports.

Once a year, typically on the Friday nearest to April Fools' Day, TSL releases a mock edition of the newspaper with funny articles and satirical news stories.

Notable coverage

As the Claremont Colleges' paper of record, TSL has provided much of the original reporting for major events at the 5Cs throughout their history. In recent years, TSLs reporting has been frequently referenced by national media outlets reporting on campus controversies.

In November 2015, TSLs reporting on racial tensions at Claremont McKenna College that led to the resignation of a dean of students was widely cited by national media outlets covering the episode.

In March 2017, TSL leaked an internal Harvey Mudd College report which criticized the severe workload at the school. The leak triggered widespread protests which led the college to cancel classes for two days.

In April 2017, TSLs coverage of a blockade of a speech by conservative pundit Heather Mac Donald (as well as the sanctions subsequently imposed on some blockaders) was widely cited by national media outlets.

TSLs coverage has sometimes drawn criticism from conservative national media outlets, many of whom are fed stories by the conservative 5C Claremont Independent publication. Following the 2015 racial tensions protest, Fox News criticized TSL for providing a space specifically for students of color in an issue.

Staff

TSL maintains a staff of around 120 students, including writers, columnists, photographers, videographers, designers, copy specialists, business associates, and editors. The Claremont Colleges do not have a journalism major, so staff members come from a variety of academic backgrounds.

The newspaper's editorial board is composed of an editor-in-chief and two managing editors. All three positions have a semester term. The editor-in-chief is selected by a committee generally composed of senior staff members.

Many TSL alumni have gone on to have prominent journalism careers. Andrew Jaffe from Pomona's class of 1960, who traveled to Nashville to cover the sit-in movement for TSL, later became an executive at Adweek and oversaw the Clio Awards. Mary Schmich from Pomona's class of 1975, who co-edited the paper, won the 2012 Pulitzer Prize for commentary for her columns in the Chicago Tribune. Former New York Times executive editor and Pulitzer winner Bill Keller from Pomona's class of 1970 edited the Collegian when he was in college and maintains close ties with TSLs current staff.

Editors-in-chief

See also
KSPC Claremont Colleges' radio station
 other 7C news organizations
Claremont Courier City of Claremont's newspaper of record
 (includes many TSL alums)
List of college and university student newspapers in the United States

References

Bibliography

External links

Periodicals of the Claremont Colleges collection at the Claremont Colleges library

Claremont Colleges
Student newspapers published in California
Newspapers established in 1889
Newspapers published in Greater Los Angeles
1889 establishments in California
Student organizations established in 1889
Weekly newspapers published in California